Taylor Welch (born November 1, 1989) is an American rugby footballer who played one professional rugby league match for the Warrington Wolves in the Super League in 2008. Welch was selected to represent the United States national team at the 2013 Rugby League World Cup.

Background
Welch was born in Dallas, Texas, United States. He and his father relocated to Warrington, Cheshire, England in 2003, following the death of his mother. He attended Crosfields School and Lymm High School.

Playing career
Having played American football in his youth, he transitioned to rugby union in school and was convinced to try rugby league by the Warrington Wolves head coach Paul Cullen, joining the team's youth academy.

In 2008, Welch was drafted onto Warrington's 19-man roster to cover for an injured Chris Riley. Riley was cleared to play, however Welch had trained so well that he was selected to the 13-man playing roster ahead of teammate Kevin Penny for the game against the Castleford Tigers. He is thought to have become the first American to play for Warrington Wolves and the first ever to play in the Super League.

Welch has continued to play rugby union. He was selected in the United States training squad for the Rugby Union NAWIRA Sevens Qualifiers in the Bahamas. He has played for Fylde Rugby Club, Pays d'Aix RC in Pro D2 and Sale F.C., and applied for U.K. citizenship to enable him to count as a player in Super League. Welch subsequently relocated back to the United States. He has continued playing rugby with the New York Raiders of the American National Rugby League and the Chicago Griffins rugby union team, and has trained with the startup Chicago Stockyarders.

In October 2014, Welch signed with the semi-professional Townsville Blackhawks for their inaugural season in Australia's Queensland Cup.

References

External links
Wyles and Ngwenya in USA Sevens squad

1989 births
Living people
American emigrants to England
American rugby league players
American rugby union players
Aston Bulls players
Chicago Griffins RFC players
Fylde Rugby Club players
New York Raiders rugby league players
Provence Rugby players
Rugby league wingers
Townsville Blackhawks players
United States national rugby league team players
Warrington Wolves players
Rugby union players from Warrington
Rugby league players from Warrington
American expatriate sportspeople in France
American expatriate rugby union players
American expatriate rugby league players
Expatriate rugby union players in France
Expatriate rugby league players in Australia
Sportspeople from Dallas